Edwin Thomas Banning (1864–1940) was an American architect from Providence, Rhode Island.

Banning, the fourth of six children, was born in Danielson, Connecticut, to Rev. Carlos and Harriet Elizabeth (Pitman) Banning. Natives of Newport, Rhode Island, they returned there when their son was very young. He attended Rogers High School and Brown University. He dropped out in his junior year, and began working as a draftsman for Gould & Angell, prominent Providence architects.

Edwin Banning married Isabella Thornton (b. 1864 in Rochdale, England; d. 1915 in San Diego, USA) on June 13, 1883 in Taunton, Massachusetts. They had one daughter, Bernice Thornton Banning (b. 1885 in Providence, Rhode Island; d. in 1954 Ventura, California). After the death of Isabella, he married Agnes Gertrude Cristadoro (b. 1879 in Kensington, England; d. 1928 in Los Angeles, USA) November 1920 in San Diego, California.

Banning established an office in Providence in the mid-1890s. He began to specialize in public buildings, including a number of schools. He relocated his office to Newport in 1900, and back to Providence in 1903. Later that year he made his brother-in-law, Henry C. Thornton, a partner in Banning & Thornton. This association continued until 1912, when Banning went west to San Diego, California. He continued to practice as an architect, and died there in 1940.

Architectural works
Edwin T. Banning, before 1903:
 Casino, Roger Williams Park, Providence, RI (1896)
 Hospital and Gymnasium, Sockanosset School for Boys, Howard, RI (1898) - Demolished.
 Wayland Park School, 15 Curtis St., Cranston, RI (1898) - Demolished.
 Y. M. C. A. Gymnasium, 41 Mary St., Newport, RI (1900–01) - Demolished.
 Middletown Free Library (Old), 1251 W. Main Rd., Middletown, RI (1902)
Banning & Thornton, 1903–1912:
 Cranston High School (Old), 845 Park Ave., Cranston, RI (1903–04)
 Warwick High School (Old), 319 Providence St., West Warwick, RI (1904–05) - Highly altered.
 Humboldt Avenue Fire Station, 155 Humboldt Ave., Providence, RI (1905)
 Old State House (Remodeling), 150 Benefit St., Providence, RI (1906)
 Rhode Island Building, Jamestown Exposition, Norfolk, VA (1906–07) - Demolished.
 Arlington Grammar School, 1090 Cranston St., Cranston, RI (1907) - Demolished.
 Norwood Avenue Grammar School, 205 Norwood Ave., Cranston, RI (1907) - Highly altered.
 East Providence High School (Old), 20 Whelden Ave., East Providence, RI (1908–09)
 Temple Beth-El, 688 Broad St., Providence, RI (1910–11)
 Gleason House, Rhode Island School for the Feeble-Minded, Exeter, RI (1912) - Demolished.
Edwin T. Banning, from 1912:
 St. Vincent R. C. Church, 4080 Hawk St., San Diego, CA (1913) - Demolished.

References

1864 births
1940 deaths
Architects from Connecticut
Architects from Providence, Rhode Island